Loch of Clunie is a small lowland freshwater loch that is located  west of Blairgowrie, Perth and Kinross, Scotland.

Clunie Castle

The Loch of Clunie has a single island, said to be artificial, which has the remains of Clunie Castle. The house was designed as a simple L-plan tower house and was built by George Brown Bishop of Dunkeld between 1485 and 1514 as a spiritual retreat. A chapel was dedicated to St Catherine in the house in 1507. The island is surrounded by a dry-stone wall and there is a well designed pier at the south-end of the island, that was constructed in 1512–1513.  The house was burnt down in a fire and was restored at the end of the 18th Century. It is now currently a ruin as the roof fell in in 1989 and was never rebuilt.

References

Freshwater lochs of Scotland
Lochs of Perth and Kinross
Tay catchment